Monella Street (Italian:Monella di strada) is a 1920 Italian silent directed by Umberto Fracchia and starring Carmen Boni.

Cast
 Carmen Boni 
 Romano Calò 
 Lia Liasche 
 Margherita Losanges 
Pietro Pezzullo

References

Bibliography
 Stewart, John. Italian film: a who's who. McFarland, 1994.

External links

1920 films
1920s Italian-language films
Films directed by Umberto Fracchia
Italian silent feature films
Italian black-and-white films